When There's No More Room In Hell: Volume I is a compilation album, compiled and released by Sugar Daddy Productions, featuring songs from various artists from the underground hip-hop and horrorcore scenes. The album is advertised as having 38 exclusive tracks.

Track listing

Disc 1
 Bloodshed Part 2 - Danny Diablo (Feat. Big Left, Danny Boy, & Ceekay)
 Maniak - Lawst
 Life Of Misery - Ric-Lo-X
 Zombiestyle - Jason Porter (Feat. Intrinzik)
 Time's Up - Dead Creeps Orchestra
 Always, Forever - Wolfpac
 What See What Get - Geist (Feat. Provokal)
 Ghetto Terrorist - Grave Plott
 Ladylike - True High Class
 Slap Dat Hoe - Q-Strange
 Amalgamation - Ruthless
 Ralph Macchio Memoirs - Q-Ball (Feat. Eddie Cheddar)
 When There's No More - Lo Key
 Armageddon - Brainsick (Feat. Jaronimo)
 Check Royalty - Big B (Feat. Dirtball)
 Underground Sound - Havok
 CoatTails - Playaz Lounge Crew
 Welcome To Purgatory - Purgatory Bound
 Soul To Take - Dr. Gigglez
 Survivor - Vanilla Ice

Disc 2
 Silent Hill (Samuel Mix) - V Sinizter
 Vengeance Is Mine - M-Theory
 Where's Ya God Now? - Bawston Strangla
 2 Or 3 Steps - I-45
 How U Live - Dieabolik (Feat. Madman)
 Edicius - ClaAs
 B.O.R. II Blood Smear - Professor Fresh
 Abduction 101 - X-Breed
 We're All Dead - Dinerologic
 Dark Side Of Earth - L.U. Cipha
 The Sadist - J Reno The Sadist
 Story Of A Crook - Madhouse Clique
 Smell Their Fear - Scum
 Love After Death - Stitchez
 All I Know Is Hate - GuttaMind
 One Day - Troubled Mindz
 Trust Issue - Delusional
 The Window - Defekt

External links 
 Official ordering page for the CD

Hip hop compilation albums
2006 compilation albums